Silvia Monfort (born Simone Marguerite Favre-Bertin; 6 June 1923 – 30 March 1991) was a French actress and theatre director. She was the daughter of the sculptor Charles-Maurice Favre-Bertin and the wife of Pierre Gruneberg. She was named a Knight of the Legion of Honour in 1973, an Officer of Arts and Letters in 1979, and a Commander of Arts and Letters in 1983. She is buried in Père Lachaise Cemetery.

Early life
Monfort was born in the neighborhood of Le Marais, on Rue Elzévir, a short distance from Rue de Thorigny, where she would set up her first theatre. Her family lived in this Parisian neighborhood for seven generations. Having lost her mother at an early age, she was sent to boarding school by her father. She undertook her secondary studies first at Lycée Victor-Hugo and then at Lycée Victor Duruy. 

She obtained her baccalauréat at 14 with special permission. Her father had intended for her to pursue a job at Gobelin manufactory, but instead she took theatre classes with Jean Hervé and Jean Valcourt. In 1939, aged 16, she met Maurice Clavel, who directed the Resistance network in Eure-et-Loir. Under the pseudonym "Sinclair" (the name of a hill that looms over Sète), she participated in the liberation of Nogent-le-Rotrou and Chartres in 1944. She was one of the notables who welcomed General De Gaulle on the square in front of the Cathedral of Chartres . Once the war ended, she married Maurice Clavel. She was decorated with the Croix de Guerre by General De Gaulle and the Bronze Star by General Patton.

Cocteau, Vilar, and Théâtre National Populaire 
In 1945, she acted in Federico García Lorca's play La casa de Bernarda Alba. Her personality drew the attention of Edwige Feuillère, who she then acted alongside in L'Aigle à deux têtes by Jean Cocteau. The play was first presented in 1946 at the Royal Theatre of the Galeries Royales of Saint-Hubert in Brussels. Her performance received high praise and the play had considerable success. After performances in Lyon, the play had its Parisian premiere at the Théâtre Hébertot, followed by performances at La Fenice in Venice.

Through Clavel, she met Jean Vilar in 1947 and participated in the Théâtre National Populaire (TNP). She participated in the first Festival d'Avignon with The Story of Tobias and Sarah (1947). Alongside Gérard Philipe, she played Chimène in Le Cid, performed at Chaillot, and subsequently went on tour across Europe (1954). Next, she played with Vilar in Cinna and The Marriage of Figaro.

Cinema
Monfort made her film debut in Les Anges du péché'. Director Robert Bresson had hired her without knowing she was an actress, as he was looking for non-professionals for his film. In 1948, she played the role of Édith de Berg in the cinematic adaptation of L'Aigle à deux têtes by Cocteau with Feuillère and Jean Marais.

In 1955, Agnès Varda, then a photographer at the TNP, directed her first film, La Pointe Courte, one of the first of the New Wave. Varda remembers Monfort in the film as "Curious and a pioneer by nature, she threw herself into the project with delight and discipline. I really think she was happy to fight for a cinema of the future."

Separated from Maurice Clavel, Silvia Monfort shared her life with and participated in the films of director Jean-Paul Le Chanois. Despite her having an arm in a plaster cast, he insisted that she play a Polish prisoner with François Périer and Pierre Fresnay in a film inspired by a true story called Les Évadés. She then co-starred with Jean Gabin and Nicole Courcel in Le Cas du Docteur Laurent, a film advocating for painless childbirth (1957), and then in Le Chanois' film Par-dessus le Mur (1961), which dealt with parent-child relations. In two films dealing with social conditions, she was Eponine of Les Misérables, alongside Gabin and Bourvil (1958), and then the Gypsy girl, Myrtille, in Mandrin beside Georges Rivière and Georges Wilson. This film concluded her cinematic career and her relationship with Le Chanois in 1962.

On the road
During the 1960s, Silvia Monfort was passionate about cultural decentralization and, thus, set out on the road with Jean Danet and her Tréteaux de France. She actively participated in this experiment, seeing that new and contemporary plays were staged alternately with the classical repertoire. On 23 June 1965, Silvia wrote to Pierre Gruneberg: "I've convinced Danet to schedule for September a series of performances of the Prostitute and of Suddenly, Last Summer under a big top around Paris (in this way the inconvenient returning directors will be able to come see it there if they need to). Oh, I would have done what I could".

She wrote at least once, sometimes several times a day, to her companion Pierre Gruneberg. In the collection of this correspondence, Letters to Pierre, Danielle Netter, assistant director, adds: "The Tréteaux de France was an extraordinary theatrical tool that gave us the occasion to present Sophocles and other dramatic poets before the tenants of the HLM, and one evening to hear a spectator declare at the end of Electra to Silvia 'It's as beautiful as a Western!', which filled our tragedienne with joy."

Tragedienne
Monfort explored ancient and modern theatrical repertoires for nearly half a century, whether with the Tréteaux, in festivals, in private theatres, and later in her Carrés. She acted in no less than five versions of Phèdre in different theatres as well as on television. She interpreted numerous works of Racine and Corneille. She performed Sophocles' Electra in the most incongruous places, such as the "trou des Halles" in Paris in 1970.

She acted in the plays and theatrical adaptations of Maurice Clavel, such as The Isle of Goats and The Noon Terrace. She was directed by Roger Planchon at Villeurbanne in 1959 in Love's Second Surprise and by Luchino Visconti in Paris in 1961 in 'Tis Pity She's a Whore beside Alain Delon and Romy Schneider. She made appearances in Summer and Smoke (1953) and Suddenly, Last Summer (1965) by Tennessee Williams. She incarnated the Sphinx of Cocteau's The Infernal Machine in festivals as well as on television with Claude Giraud in 1963. She was The Respectful Prostitute of Jean-Paul Sartre (1965) and The Duchess of Malfi beside Raf Vallone (1981).

At Carré Thorigny, she brought about the debut of Bernard Giraudeau in Tom Eyen's Why Doesn't Anna's Dress Want to Come off (1974). She was also seen in The Oresteia (1962) and The Persians of Aeschylus (1984). She portrayed Lucrezia Borgia in Victor Hugo (1975), Marguerite de Bourgogne in The Tower of Nesle by Alexandre Dumas, père (1986), Alarica in The Evil Is Spreading (1963), Maid in Jacques Audiberti (1971), Ethel in The Rosenbergs Should Not Die (1968) by Alain Decaux. She took on Ionesco with Jacques, or the Submission (1971), When We Dead Awaken by Henrik Ibsen (1976), and then The Lady from the Sea' (1977). To celebrate the centenary of Cocteau's birth, she appeared for the last time on the Vaugirard stage in The Two Ways in 1989.

In 1972, Monfort described her favorite roles: "Gérard Philippe, whose Chimène I was, had a habit of replying that his favorite role was his next. For me, the one that I am playing fulfills me. Imagine! What marvelous relations between an actor and his character. They see each other every day, but they also know that it's not forever, so they have to work twice as hard. Certain characters have more of an affinity for us. I have always felt myself closer to adolescents thirsting for the absolute than to women with divided hearts. I prefer Electra to Clytemnestra. I was wildly in love with Alarica from The Evil Is Spreading, Éponine from Les Misérables and recently The Maid by Audiberti. But this doesn't prevent me from knowing beautiful stories about those whom I wouldn't play. Of all the heroines, the one who perhaps excited me most was the queen of the Amazons, Penthesilea. When she thought herself defeated by Achilles, she refused to follow him into his kingdom. She wanted him to be king in her land. So she tore him up with her nails, devoured him with her teeth, and said: All women swear to their lovers: I will eat you as long as I love you – well, I did it."

Phèdre

Silvia Monfort is among the most influential performers of Phèdre. A study by the CNRS about the great tragediennes who have incarnated this character in the 20th century was published in Pour la Science, the French version of Scientific American. This study analyzed the relationship between the pauses and the versified text as well as the fluctuations in delivery and demonstrated that Silvia Monfort made the most important use of them (92% of pauses and 3.8 syllables/minute) in relation to other tragic actresses (Sarah Bernhardt, Marie Bell, Nada Strancar and Natacha Amal); this characteristic of her acting contributed to Silvia Monfort's performances being received with an exceptional quality of psychological depth and emotion.

She said of her character in 1973: "Phèdre burns in each one of us. We have hardly grasped the image in the mirror when she dims, and the imminence of this obliteration sharpens the acuteness of the reflection […] What matters is that there has been a meeting in mystery even from the first reading. It is like desire, or rather it is present in the look that provokes it, or rather there will never be unison. All the opinions, competent, imperious, singular, that were offered to me on the subject of Phèdre, and to which I listened intensely, had no other result with me than to lead me back to my Phèdre, despite her long being hazy, with the obviousness of a pawn moving back to the first square on a board game […] this is the wonder of Phèdre: to tackle it is to resign oneself to it."

Circus and mime school
In 1972, with the support of Jacques Duhamel, then Minister of Cultural Affairs, she set up and directed the Carré Thorigny Rue de Thorigny in the neighborhood of Le Marais in Paris, where she put on multidisciplinary shows. She was especially interested in the circus world and organized an exhibit entitled Circus in Color, which met with success. Following her contacts with circus people and meeting with Alexis Gruss, she organized old-style circus performances in the courtyard of the Hôtel Salé, in front of the Carré. The public's fancy led Monfort and Gruss to set up (in 1974) the first circus and mime school in France, L'école au Carré. They wanted to highlight the nobility of the circus's origins and were involved in bringing to life an updated old-style circus. The Gruss circus followed Monfort in her next moves until it became a national circus in 1982.

At the Carré Thorigny, Alain Decaux awarded Monfort the Legion of Honor in 1973, paying homage to "her passion for the theatre and the inflexible will with which she serves it."

The Carré had to leave Rue de Thorigny in 1974 because of a property transaction. Monfort thus transferred her Nouveau Carré into the old théâtre de la Gaîté-Lyrique. It opened on 1 October 1974, and she set up the Gruss circus's big top in the square in front of the theatre. The Nouveau Carré (officially the Centre d'Action Culturelle de Paris) — or "Paris Cultural Center" — eventually encompassed the main theatre, two smaller houses for music and more intimate shows, the circus, a circus school, and a mime school. From 1978 to 1979, the circus, which had grown in importance, was moved under a new big top in the Jardin d'Acclimatation. In 1980, the Gaîté Lyrique theatre had to be renovated, and she had to move her Carré (now Carré-Silvia Monfort) onto the site of the former abattoirs of Vaugirard, where she set up the theatre under a specially built big top, and brought along the Gruss circus's big top. The circus school was moved to another facility. Meanwhile, lacking funds, the project of renovating the Gaîté-Lyrique was abandoned.

She continued working to establish a permanent "Carré" at Vaugirard on the site of and in place of the big tops. The decision to build the theatre as it is today was made in 1986. On 7 March 1989, she wrote: "This will be my theatre. Even so, incredible! I don't know a single living person for whom his own theatre was built, with his name and of the right size." But she died a few months before its completion. Inaugurated in 1992, it bears her name: Théâtre Silvia-Monfort.

She died on 30 March 1991 of lung cancer in Courchevel.

The Silvia Monfort Prize
Pierre Gruneberg, who became Silvia Monfort's lover in 1963 and married her on 24 May 1990, founded the Silvia Monfort Prize Association in 1996. This prize is issued every two years to a young actress by a professional jury. Since its inception, the prizewinners have been:
 Smadi Wolfman (1996)
 Rachida Brakni (1998)
 Mona Abdel Hadi (2000)
 Isabelle Joly (2002)
 Marion Bottolier (2004)
 Gina Ndjemba (2006)

Work

Filmography
1943: Les Anges du pêché (by Robert Bresson) (with Renée Faure) - Agnès
1947: La Grande Maguet (by Roger Richebé) (with Madeleine Robinson) - Anaïs Arnold
1948: L'Aigle à deux têtes (by Jean Cocteau) (with Edwige Feuillère and Jean Marais) - Édith de Berg
1949: The Secret of Mayerling (by Jean Delannoy) (with Jean Marais) - L'archiduchesse Stéphanie
1955: Les Évadés (by Jean-Paul Le Chanois) (with Pierre Fresnay and François Périer) - Wanda
1955: La Pointe Courte (by Agnès Varda) (with Philippe Noiret) - Elle
1956: Ce soir les jupons volent (by Dimitri Kirsanoff) (with Sophie Desmarets) - Huguette Laurent-Maréchal
1956: Le Théâtre national populaire (Short, by Georges Franju) (with Jean Vilar)
1957: The Case of Doctor Laurent (by Jean-Paul Le Chanois) (with Jean Gabin and Nicole Courcel) - Catherine Loubet
1958: Les Misérables (by Jean-Paul Le Chanois) (with Jean Gabin and Bourvil) - Eponine Thénardier
1959: Du rififi chez les femmes (by Alex Joffé) (with Robert Hossein and Roger Hanin) - Yoko
1960: La Française et l'amour (sketch La Femme seule) (by Jean-Paul Le Chanois) (with Robert Lamoureux and Martine Carol) - Gilberte Dumas (segment "Femme seule, La")
1961: Par-dessus le mur (by Jean-Paul Le Chanois) - Simone
1962: Mandrin (by Jean-Paul Le Chanois) (with Georges Rivière and Georges Wilson) - Myrtille
1963: L'itinéraire marin (by Jean Rollin)
1970: Le revolver et la rose (by Jean Desvilles)
1975: Jean Marais, artisan du rêve (Short, by Gérard Devillers) - Narrator
1978: Nuova Colonia (by Patrick Bureau) - La Spera

Theatre

Private theatres, TNP and Tréteaux de France

 1945: Joan of Arc by Charles Péguy (Dreux)
 1945: La casa de Bernarda Alba by Federico García Lorca (Studio des Champs-Élysées)
 1946: L'Aigle à deux têtes by Jean Cocteau (Théâtre Hébertot)
 1947: L'Histoire de Tobie et de Sara by Paul Claudel (1st festival d'Avignon)
 1948: Shéhérazade by Jules Supervielle (Festival d'Avignon)
 1949: Pas d'amour by Ugo Betti, adaptation de Maurice Clavel (théâtre des Noctambules)
 1950: Andromaque by Racine (Nîmes)
 1951: Maguelone by Maurice Clavel (Théâtre Marigny)
 1951: Electra by Sophocles, adaptation by Maurice Clavel (Mardis de l'œuvre, Théâtre des Noctambules)
 1952: Les Radis creux by Jean Meckert (Théâtre de Poche)
 1952: Doña Rosita la soltera by Federico García Lorca (Mardis de l'œuvre, Théâtre des Noctambules)
 1953: The Isle of Goats by Ugo Betti, adaptation by Maurice Clavel (Noctambules)
 1953: Le Chevalier des neiges by Boris Vian (Caen)
 1953: The Merchant of Venice by Shakespeare (Noctambules)
 1953: Summer and Smoke by Tennessee Williams (Théâtre de l'Œuvre)
 1954: Le Cid by Corneille (TNP)
 1954: Cinna by Corneille (TNP)
 1955: Penthesilea by Heinrich Von Kleist (Théâtre Hébertot)
 1956: Marie Stuart by Friedrich Schiller (Théâtre du Vieux-Colombier)
 1956: The Marriage of Figaro by Beaumarchais (TNP)
 1957: Pitié pour les héros by M.A. Baudy (Comédie de Paris)
 1959: Love's Second Surprise by Marivaux (Villeurbanne)
 1959: Bérénice by Racine (Festival de Dijon)
 1959: La Machine infernale by Jean Cocteau (Festival de Vaison-la-Romaine)
 1959: Lady Godiva by Jean Canolle (Festivals, Théâtre Moderne, Théâtre Édouard VII)
 1960: Edward II by Christopher Marlowe (Villeurbanne)
 1960: Love's Second Surprise by Marivaux (Villeurbanne)
 1960: Si la foule nous voit ensemble by Claude Bal (Théâtre de Paris)
 1960: Arden of Faversham (Festivals de Dijon et de Vaison-la-Romaine)
 1960: Phèdre by Racine (Théâtre du Vieux-Colombier, tournée Européenne)
 1961: 'Tis Pity She's a Whore by John Ford (Théâtre de Paris)
 1962: The Oresteia by Aeschylus, adaptation by Paul Claudel
 1962: La Nuit de feu by Marcelle Maurette (Port-Royal)
 1962: Helen by Euripides, adaptation by Jean Canolle (Narbonne)
 1962: Horace by Corneille (Scala de Milan)
 1963: The Evil Is Spreading by Jacques Audiberti (Théâtre La Bruyère)
 1963: The Governess by Vitaliano Brancati (Théâtre en Rond)
 1963: Marie Stuart by Friedrich Schiller (Les Nuits de Bourgogne)
 1964: Life Is but a Dream by Pedro Calderón de la Barca (Festival d'Annecy)
 1964: Julius Caesar by Shakespeare (Théâtre Sarah Bernhardt, Lyon)
 1964: Catharsis by Michel Parent (Dijon)
 1965: Suddenly, Last Summer by Tennessee Williams (Tréteaux de France, Mathurins)
 1965: The Respectful Prostitute by Jean-Paul Sartre (Tréteaux de France, Mathurins)
 1965: The Story of Tobias and Sarah by Paul Claudel (Les Nuits de Bourgogne)
 1965: Electra by Sophocles, adaptation de Maurice Clavel (Festival d'Annecy, Tréteaux de France)
 1965: Enemies by Maxim Gorky (Théâtre des Amandiers Nanterre)
 1965: La Surprise de l'amour by Marivaux (Théâtre des Amandiers Nanterre, festivals)
 1966: Electra by Sophocles, adaptation de Maurice Clavel (Mathurins)
 1966: The Evil Is Spreading by Jacques Audiberti (Tréteaux de France)
 1966: Suddenly, Last Summer by Tennessee Williams (Tréteaux de France, Mathurins)
 1966: The Respectful Prostitute by Jean-Paul Sartre (Tréteaux de France, Mathurins)
 1967: Phèdre by Racine (Tréteaux de France)
 1967: The Evil Is Spreading by Jacques Audiberti (Tréteaux de France)
 1968: The Rosenbergs Should Not Die by Alain Decaux (Tréteaux de France)
 1968: The Respectful Prostitute by Jean-Paul Sartre (Tréteaux de France)
 1969: The Rosenbergs Should Not Die by Alain Decaux (Porte Saint-Martin)
 1970: The Respectful Prostitute by Jean-Paul Sartre (Halles de Paris)
 1970: Electra by Sophocles, adaptation by Maurice Clavel (Halles de Paris)
 1970: Jacques, or the Submission by Ionesco (Château de Boucard)
 1970: The Maid by Jacques Audiberti (Nice)
 1971: The Maid by Jacques Audiberti (Festival du Marais)

Carré Thorigny

 1972: Opens October 12
 1973: Le Bal des cuisinières by Bernard Da Costa (and at the festival d'Avignon)
 1973: Phèdre by Racine
 1973: Cantique des cantiques, oratorio by Roger Frima
 1973: Conversations dans le Loir-et-Cher by Paul Claudel
 1973: Cirque Gruss at the Hôtel Salé
 1973: Jean Cocteau and the Angels, poetic soirée
 1973: Louise Labé, poetic soirée
 1974: Why Doesn't Anna's Dress Want to Come off by Tom Eyen
 1974: Closes at the end of September.

Nouveau Carré Gaîté-Lyrique

 1974: Opening of the circus School on October 15
 1974, November and December: Les Comptoirs de la Baie d'Hudson by Jacques Guimet done by the "In and Out Theatre", Great Hall
 1975, Edgar Poe, done by the "Ballet-Théâtre Joseph Russillo", Great Hall:
- January and February, Mémoires pour demain and Il était une fois comme toutes les fois
- May, Fantasmes, original creation
 1975, January to April: Old-Style Circus with the Gruss family, Great Hall
 1975, March to April: Seven Weeks in Song with Roger Siffer, Dick Annegarn, Jean-Marie Vivier and Monique Morelli, Serge Kerval and Anne Vanderlove, Gilles Servat, Great Hall
 1975, June to July: Dimitri Clown, Great Hall
 1975, September: Histoire du soldat by Igor Stravinsky and Ramuz, done by the Solistes de Marseille, directed by Devy Erlich, Great Hall
 1975, September to October: Le Tableau, comic opera by Ionesco and Calvi, Great Hall
 1975-1976, November to March: Lucrezia Borgia by Victor Hugo (presented at the Festival d'Avignon in August 1975), directed by Fabio Pacchoni, Great Hall
 1976, March: Hélène Martin Recital, Great Hall
 1976, March: Henri Tachan Recital, Gruss big top
 1976, October, November, December: When We Dead Awaken by Henrik Ibsen, adaptation by Maurice Clavel, Great Hall
 1977, January, February, March: The Lady from the Sea by Henrik Ibsen, Great Hall
 1977, April to May: A Doll's House by Henrik Ibsen, done by the Ensemble Théâtral Mobile, Great Hall
 1977: Songs of Bilitis by Pierre Louÿs
 1977: Visit of René-Guy Cadou, poetic soirée
 1977: Nuova Colonia de Luigi Pirandello
 1977: The Burial of a Boss de Dario Fo (Mulhouse)
 1977: Closes at year's end

Jardin d'Acclimatation
 Just one season, from 1978 to 1979

Carré Silvia Monfort Vaugirard

 1979: La Cantate à trois voix by Paul Claudel (Abbatiale de Rouen)
 1979: La Fourmi dans le corps by Jacques Audiberti
 1979: The Noon Terrace by Maurice Clavel
 1980: Conversation dans le Loir-et-Cher de Paul Claudel INA Archives: Daniel Gélin and Silvia Monfort in Conversation dans le Loir-et-Cher (TF1, 1988)
 1981: Ariane at Naxos by Georg Brenda (Rennes and Théâtre des Champs-Élysées)
 1981: Breakfast at Desdemona's by Janus Krasinski
 1981: The Duchess of Malfi by John Webster
 1982: Phèdre by Racine
 1983: Hot and Cold by Fernand Crommelynck
 1984: The Persians by Aeschylus
 1984: Die Panne by Friedrich Dürrenmatt
 1985: The Millionairess by George Bernard Shaw
 1985: Bajazet by Racine
 1985: The Tower of Nesle by Alexandre Dumas, père
 1987: Britannicus by Racine
 1987: Iphigénie by Racine
 1988: Théodore by Corneille
 1989: The Two Ways by Jean Cocteau

Directed by her
 1965: Electra by Sophocles, adaptation by Maurice Clavel (Tréteaux de France)
 1970: Electra by Sophocles, adaptation by Maurice Clavel (Halles de Paris)
 1979: La Cantate à trois voix de Paul Claudel (Abbatiale de Rouen)
 1984: The Persians by Aeschylus (Carré Silvia Monfort Vaugirard)
 1987: Iphigénie by Racine (Carré Silvia Monfort Vaugirard)
 1988: Théodore by Corneille (Carré Silvia Monfort Vaugirard)
 1989: The Two Ways by Jean Cocteau (Carré Silvia Monfort Vaugirard)

Television
 1959: Bérénice by Racine
 1960: Phèdre by Racine
 1960: Bajazet by Racine
 1962: Helen by Euripides
 1962: The Night of Fire by Marcelle Maurette
 1963: The Infernal Machine by Jean Cocteau - Directed by Claude Loursais
 1965: King Lear by Shakespeare
 1967: The Trojan war will not take place by Jean Giraudoux
 1971: The Bunker by Alain Decaux
 1975: Why Doesn't Anna's Dress Want to Come off by Tom Eyen - Directed by Armand Ridel
 1978: The Marshal of Ancre by Alfred de Vigny
 1980: Edgar Poe, theatre-ballet by Joseph Russillo
 1980: Phèdre by Racine
 1980: Electra by Sophocles
 1981: Conversation in the Loir-et-Cher by Paul Claudel
 1982: Phèdre by Racine
 1982: The Dream of Icarus, TV film by Jean Kerchbron
 1986: Bajazet by Racine
 1986: The Tower of Nesle by Alexandre Dumas, père

Bibliography
Novels

 Il ne m'arrivera rien (Nothing Will Happen to Me) - Éditions Fontaine - 1946
 Aimer qui vous aima (To Love Someone Who Has Loved You) - Paris, Éditions Julliard - 1951
 Le droit chemin (The Right Way) - Paris, Éditions Julliard - 1954
 La Raia (Les mains pleines de doigts) The Raia (Hands Full of Fingers) - Paris, Éditions Julliard - 1959
 Les ânes rouges (The Red Donkeys) - Éditions Julliard in 1966, then Éditions du Rocher in 2003 - 
 Une allure pour l'amour (L'Amble) (A Look for Love (The Amble)) - Éditions Julliard in 1971, then Le Livre de Poche in 1987 - 

Correspondence

 Lettres à Pierre 1965-1991 (Letters to Pierre 1965-1991) - Collected by Danielle Netter - Éditions du Rocher - 2003 - 

Prefaces

 Noël Devaulx: Le Cirque À L'ancienne (The Old-style Circus) - Henri Veryer ed. - 1977
Racine : Phèdre - Le Livre de Poche - 1985 - 
Corneille : Cinna - Le Livre de Poche - 1987 - 

Biographies and articles

 Paul-Louis Mignon: Silvia Monfort - Article from l'Avant scène théâtre, nr. 411, 1968
 Régis Santon: Le théâtre Silvia Monfort - Article from l'Avant-scène théâtre, nr. 531, 1973
 C. Parent: Le quinzième arrondissement - Le carré Silvia Monfort (The 15th arrondissement - Silvia Monfort Square) - the Paris collection and her heritage, p. 204
 Françoise Piazza: Silvia Monfort - Éditions Favre - 1988 - 
 Guy Boquet and Jean-Claude Drouot: Le parcours racinien de Silvia Monfort (The Racinian Path of Silvia Monfort), Revue d'histoire du théâtre, nr. 206, 2000.
 Exhibit, Paris, Bibliothèque nationale de France, Richelieu site, Crypt, 16 December 2003 – 25 January 2004, Une vie de combat pour le théâtre - Bibliothèque Nationale de France -  

Audio

 Cahiers de doléances des femmes en 1789 (Condolence Books of Women in 1789) - Cassette, La Bibliothèque Des Voix - Éditions Des Femmes - 1989
 Les Enfants terribles (see section "the children by the radio") by Jean Cocteau (1947) - CD, Éditions Phonurgia Nova & INA - 1992 - 

On video

 Le Cas du docteur Laurent - Film by Jean-Paul Le Chanois - single DVD, Zone 2 (Éditions LCJ)
 Les Misérables - Film in two eras by Jean-Paul Le Chanois - 2-set DVD, Zone 2 (Les Années Cinquante collection- Éditions René Chateau)

References

External links
Théâtre Silvia-Monfort

1923 births
1991 deaths
Actresses from Paris
Burials at Père Lachaise Cemetery
French stage actresses
French film actresses
French television actresses
20th-century French actresses
Female resistance members of World War II
French women in World War II
Foreign recipients of United States military awards and decorations